Walter Foxcroft Hawkins (July 12, 1863 – December 28, 1922) was an American attorney and local political figure who, from 1896 to 1897, served as  mayor of Pittsfield, the largest city and county seat of Massachusetts' Berkshire County.

A native of Pittsfield, Hawkins was the son of William T. Hawkins and his wife Harriet E. Foxcroft.  He received his A.B. from Williams College  in 1884 and his L.L.B. from Columbia Law School in 1886.  Following his bar exams, he opened a law firm in his hometown and, on October 7, 1891, married Helen A. Rich.  Following his 1896–97 term as mayor, he continued with his law practice and also served as vice president of Berkshire Life Insurance Company.  At the age of 59, he committed suicide at his law office in Pittsfield by shooting himself through the heart with a revolver.

See also
List of mayors of Pittsfield, Massachusetts

Notes

Mayors of Pittsfield, Massachusetts
American politicians who committed suicide
Suicides by firearm in Massachusetts
Williams College alumni
Columbia Law School alumni
1863 births
1922 suicides